Salanoemia is a genus of grass skipper butterflies in the family Hesperiidae.

Species
Salanoemia sala (Hewitson, 1866) - maculate lancer
Salanoemia noemi  (de Nicéville, 1885)   India (Sikkim, Assam)
Salanoemia tavoyana  (Evans, 1926)  Burma, Thailand, North Malaysia, Borneo
Salanoemia fuscicornis  (Elwes & Edwards, 1897)  Burma, Thailand, Laos, North Malaysia (Langkawi), Borneo
Salanoemia shigerui  Maruyama, 2000  Sumatra

Biology 
The larvae feed on Palmae including Calamus subtenuis

References

Natural History Museum Lepidoptera genus database
[http://ftp.funet.fi/pub/sci/bio/life/insecta/lepidoptera/ditrysia/hesperioidea/hesperiidae/hesperiinae/salanoemia/ Salanoemia" Eliot in Corbet & Pendlebury, 1978] at Markku Savela's Lepidoptera and Some Other Life Forms''

Hesperiinae
Hesperiidae genera